Carlos Esteban Frontini (born August 19, 1981 in General Pacheco), or simply Frontini, is an Argentine former footballer, who plays as a striker. Frontini also has Brazilian nationality.

Club career 
During the second semester of 2010, he signed a contract with Clube do Remo to play in the Série D moving in the same year to Duque de Caxias to play in the 2010 Série B.

Honors
 Campeonato Baiano: 2002
 Copa do Nordeste: 2002
 Campeonato Brasileiro Série C: 2004

Vila Nova
 Campeonato Goiano Série B: 2015
 Campeonato Brasileiro Série C: 2015

References

External links
 
 
 
 tribuna digital 
  

1981 births
Living people
Footballers from Buenos Aires
Association football forwards
Argentine footballers
Argentine expatriate footballers
Argentine expatriate sportspeople in South Korea
Argentine expatriate sportspeople in Brazil
Argentine expatriate sportspeople in Ukraine
Expatriate footballers in Brazil
Naturalized citizens of Brazil
Argentine emigrants to Brazil
Expatriate footballers in Ukraine
Expatriate footballers in South Korea
Campeonato Brasileiro Série A players
Campeonato Brasileiro Série B players
Campeonato Brasileiro Série C players
Campeonato Brasileiro Série D players
Ukrainian Premier League players
K League 1 players
Mogi Mirim Esporte Clube players   
Sport Club Corinthians Alagoano players            
Esporte Clube Vitória players
União Agrícola Barbarense Futebol Clube players
FC Vorskla Poltava players
Marília Atlético Clube players
Associação Atlética Ponte Preta players
Santos FC players
Pohang Steelers players
América Futebol Clube (RN) players
Figueirense FC players
Mirassol Futebol Clube players
Goiás Esporte Clube players
Botafogo Futebol Clube (SP) players
Clube de Regatas Brasil players
Clube Atlético Bragantino players
Clube do Remo players
Duque de Caxias Futebol Clube players
Boavista Sport Club players
Ipatinga Futebol Clube players
Red Bull Brasil players
Brasiliense Futebol Clube players
Volta Redonda FC players    
Vila Nova Futebol Clube players
Botafogo Futebol Clube (PB) players      
Club Sportivo Sergipe players
Clube Recreativo e Atlético Catalano players
Esporte Clube XV de Novembro (Piracicaba) players
Associação Desportiva Confiança players
Cianorte Futebol Clube players
Treze Futebol Clube players
Ypiranga Futebol Clube players